SS Eskmere was a small freighter built during the First World War. Completed in 1916, she was intended for the West African trade. The ship was sunk by the German submarine SM UC-75 in October 1917 with the loss of 20 crewmen.

Description 
She had a vertical triple-expansion steam engine driving a single screw propeller. The engine was rated at a total of 158 nominal horsepower and produced .

Construction and career 
Eskmere was laid down as yard number 66 by North of Ireland Shipbuilding Co. at its shipyard in Derry, Northern Ireland, for the Watson Steamship Co. The ship was Launched on 10 April 1916 as Thirlmere and completed on 11 July. Whilst fitting out, she was sold to the Lever Brothers' newly formed Bromport Steamship Co. on 11 May and renamed Eskmere.

References

Bibliography

Ships built in Northern Ireland
Steamships of the United Kingdom
Maritime incidents in 1917
World War I merchant ships of the United Kingdom
1916 ships
Ships of the Bromport Steamship Company